Women in the Sun is a 2008 South Korean television series starring Kim Ji-soo, Lee Ha-na, Han Jae-suk and Jung Gyu-woon. It aired on KBS2 from May 28 to July 31, 2008, for 20 episodes.

Plot
Shin Do-young is a popular TV news anchor who seemingly has it all: good looks and brains, a cushy job and a privileged upbringing. But Do-young has a deep, dark secret. She was abandoned at an orphanage at a young age, but was adopted by a nice, well-off couple who were unable to have children of their own. But to the couple's surprise, they conceived a few years after Do-young's adoption, which led to the birth of their biological daughter, Ji-young. Afraid of losing the love of her adoptive parents, the teenage Do-young abandoned her five-year-old sister at a train station.

Twenty years later, Do-young hires a cheerful young woman named Yoon Sa-wol as her personal shopper. But Do-young's past returns to haunt her when Sa-wol is revealed to be Ji-young. When Sa-wol learns the truth, she plans her revenge by taking everything from her erstwhile sister, including the man Do-young loves.

Cast

Main characters
Kim Ji-soo as Shin Do-young / Kim Han-sook
Shim Eun-kyung as young Do-young (at 13 years old)
Kim Min-ha as young Do-young (in the theatre scene)
Lee Ra-hye as young Do-young (as a child)
Lee Ha-na as Yoon Sa-wol / Shin Ji-young 
Jung Min-ah as young Sa-wol
Lee Min-hee as young Ji-young
Han Jae-suk as Kim Joon-se
Jung Gyu-woon as Cha Dong-woo
Maeng Se-chang as young Dong-woo

Supporting characters
Jung Ae-ri as Choi Jung-hee, Do-young's adoptive mother
Kang In-deok as Shin Soo-ho, Do-young's adoptive father
Kang Ji-sub as Hong Eun-sub
Lee Yoo-jung as Jo Hyun-joo, Eun-sub's girlfriend
Jang Young-nam as Kim Eun-bi, TV show writer
Ahn Jung-hoon as Go Hoon, production director
Yoo Jung-seok as Song Chan-young, assistant director
Ji Il-joo as Sang-gu, gofer
Kim Hye-eun as Jang Shi-eun, TV newscaster
Ha Jae-sook as Park Yong-ja, Sa-wol's friend
Kim Hyo-jin as Sister Isabelle Yoon, nun who runs the orphanage
Yoon Joo-sang as President Jang Tae-mun
Kim Mi-kyung as Park Young-sook, Do-young's biological mother
Lee Chul-min as pickpocket
Seo Ji-yeon as Secretary Jung
Yoon Hyun-sook
Jang Chae-woo
Jung Min-ah
Ahn Seo-jung
Lee Seok-goo
Jung Hyung-min
Hyun Sook-hee

Episode ratings

Source: TNS Media Korea

Awards and nominations

References

External links
  
 
 
 

2008 South Korean television series debuts
2008 South Korean television series endings
Korean Broadcasting System television dramas
Korean-language television shows
South Korean melodrama television series
South Korean romance television series
Television series by Pan Entertainment